Yaldah magazine is a magazine that was published 10 times a year, but due to costs, they stopped producing the magazine altogether. There is a website that girls still write articles on. 
As of Spring 2013 Yaldah has almost 3000 subscribers worldwide in the US, Canada, England, Israel, Australia, Spain, China as well as other countries and an editorial board of 19 girls from all over the US and Canada.

History
In 2004, Leah Caras (then Larson) published the first issue of Yaldah at the age of 13 as a way to connect Jewish girls around the world. It was published on a quarterly magazine. The magazine became more and more widely known, and different types of publications, Jewish and non-Jewish, started requesting interviews and began to publish an enormous number of articles. This helped spread the word about the magazine.

Leah Larson could not do the entire magazine on her own, especially as she was beginning to have more personal responsibilities, and in 2005, Yaldah formed their first editorial board with 13 girls, whose jobs consisted of writers, illustrators, photographers, and Q&A editors. In 2006, another editorial board was formed, and the first Jewish Girls Retreat was attended by over 50 girls.

Along with winning many other awards, in 2008, Leah Larson won $100,000 as a first place Wells Fargo Someday Stories winner. Throughout this time, many advertising campaigns were launched including the Real Readers Campaign, 10Friends, Project 2010, and more. In 2009, Yaldah Media Inc. was founded, and its first two books were published.

Yaldah Media Inc.
Yaldah has recently become Yaldah Media Inc. with a number of different divisions. Included in these are Jewish books (2 published and 1 on the way), a safe online forum, Jewish-Girls-Unite groups across the country, the Yaldah magazine, the summer and winter retreats, and much more.

References

External links
 Yaldah's official website
 Jewish Girls' Retreat website
 "Leah Larson, a young girls dream."

2004 establishments in the United States
Jewish magazines published in the United States
Magazines established in 2004
Magazines with year of disestablishment missing
Online magazines published in the United States
Online magazines with defunct print editions